Daniel Cobb Harvey (January 10, 1886-August 7, 1966), FRSC was a Canadian historian and archivist.

Biography
Harvey was born in Cape Traverse, Prince Edward Island. He attended Prince of Wales College and then Dalhousie University where he graduated in 1910. He achieved a Rhodes scholar upon graduation and then attended Oxford University where he obtained a B.A. and an M.A. From 1915 to 1931 he taught at Wesley College and then at the University of Manitoba. In 1931 he became Provincial Archivist for Nova Scotia, a newly created position and stayed in the capacity until his retirement in 1956.

He was President of the Canadian Historical Association from 1937 to 1938. He was elected a fellow of the Royal Society of Canada in 1928 and he received its J. B. Tyrrell Historical Medal in 1942.

Works
 Thomas Darcy McGee: The Prophet Of Canadian Nationality, (1923)
 The French Régime in Prince Edward Island, (1926)
 Joseph Howe And Local Patriotism, (1927)
 The Centenary Of Edward Whelan, (1926)
 The Colonization Of Canada, (1936)
 The Heart of Howe, (1939)
 
Source:

References

External links
 

1886 births
1966 deaths
20th-century Canadian historians
Alumni of The Queen's College, Oxford
Canadian archivists
Canadian Rhodes Scholars
Dalhousie University alumni
Academic staff of the Dalhousie University
Fellows of the Royal Society of Canada
Historians of Canada
Academic staff of McGill University
People from Nova Scotia
Presidents of the Canadian Historical Association
Academic staff of the University of British Columbia
Academic staff of the University of Manitoba